Rolf Tophoven (born 1937) is a German journalist and terrorism expert.

Biography
Tophoven studied German Philology and Historical Science at the University of Münster, with focus on military and guerilla history. He was a member of a catholic student fraternity. Afterwards he was a teacher of history, politics and German language in Rheydt.

Along with Hans Josef Horchem, former chief of Verfassungsschutz in Hamburg, Tophoven was vice director from 1986 of the Institut für Terrorismusforschung in Bonn (Institute for Terrorism Research) until its dissolution in 1993. It was re-founded by Tophoven in Essen as Institut für Terrorismusforschung und Sicherheitspolitik (Institute for Terrorism Research and Security Policy) on 11 September 2003.

Tophoven lives in Grefrath.

Research
Tophoven is known as an expert in terrorism and security policy. He published newspaper articles for Die Welt, as well as books about the Middle East conflicts, the GSG 9, the war in Chechnya, and about militant Islamism.

Books
 Fedayin. Guerilla ohne Grenzen, München 1975
 Politik durch Gewalt. Guerilla und Terrorismus heute, Bonn 1976
 GSG 9. Kommando gegen Terrorismus Bonn 1977, 
 Terrorismus und Guerilla, Berlin 1982, 
 Sterben für Allah. Die Schiiten und der Terrorismus, Düsseldorf 1993, 
 Der israelisch-arabische Konflikt, Bonn 1999
 Das Terrorismus-Lexikon. Täter, Opfer und Hintergründe, along with Kai Hirschmann and Wilhelm Dietl, Frankfurt am Main 2006, 
 Der Nahost-Konflikt. Dokumente, Kommentare und Meinungen, with Kinan Jaeger, Bonn 2011
 
 Der "Islamische Staat": Geschlagen, nicht besiegt. Herausforderung und Abwehr. Schriftenreihe der Bundeszentrale für politische Bildung Band 10571, Bonn 2020, .

References

External links
 Institut für Terrorismusforschung und Sicherheitspolitik

German journalists
1937 births
Living people
Experts on terrorism
Terrorism in Germany
University of Münster alumni